Vanløse station is a S-train and Copenhagen Metro station in the Vanløse district of Copenhagen, Denmark. The metro station at street level is the western terminus of lines M1 and M2. S-trains on the Frederikssund radial stop at an upper level to the south of the Metro station. It is located in fare zone 2.

The lower level, where the Metro terminus is placed, used is an S-train station, too; between 1934 and 2002 S-trains on Ring Line reversed here on their way from Hellerup to Frederiksberg.

External links
Vanløse station at Metro 
Vanløse station at Metro 
Vanløse station at DSB 

M1 (Copenhagen Metro) stations
M2 (Copenhagen Metro) stations
S-train (Copenhagen) stations
Railway stations opened in 1898
1898 establishments in Denmark
Knud Tanggaard Seest railway stations
Railway stations in Denmark opened in the 19th century